Below are the 2007 Biathlon World Championships mixed relay results held in Antholz, Italy on 8 February, 2007.

Results

References 

Mixed Relay
Mixed sports competitions